Alex Rubens is an American writer. He is best known for his work on Key & Peele, Community, and Rick and Morty.

Life and career
Rubens attended Yale University, where he was a member of the improv-comedy group the Purple Crayon. He received a Writers Guild Award for his work on Blake Shelton's Not-So-Family Christmas and three Emmy Award nominations for his work on Key & Peele. He co-wrote the feature film Keanu with Jordan Peele.

Credits

Film
Keanu (2016) - co-writer

Television
Episodes listed are those Rubens has been credited as writing or co-writing
Blake Shelton's Not So Family Christmas (2012) – writer
Community (2014–2015) – writer, executive story editor
"Cooperative Polygraphy"
"Lawnmower Maintenance & Postnatal Care"
Key & Peele (2012–2015) – writer, co-producer
Rick and Morty (2015) – writer, co-producer
"Big Trouble in Little Sanchez"
The Last O.G. (2018) - writer, producer
"Truth Safari"
Big Mouth (2018) - writer, consulting producer
"Smooch or Share"
The Twilight Zone (2019-2020) - writer, executive producer
"The Comedian"
"Blurryman"
"A Human Face"
"Try, Try"

References

External links 

Official web site

American television writers
American male television writers
Yale University alumni
Collegiate School (New York) alumni
Writers from New York City
Place of birth missing (living people)
Year of birth missing (living people)
Living people
Screenwriters from New York (state)